M1914 may refer to:
 Hotchkiss M1914, machine gun chambered for the 8mm Lebel cartridge
 Prilutsky M1914, a semi-automatic pistol
 Lewis Model 1914, a First World War-era light machine gun